Irai is an Indian Tamil-language crime thriller streaming television series produced as an Original for Aha Tamil, directed by Rajesh M. Selva. Produced by Radaan Mediaworks the series stars R. Sarathkumar in the lead role along with Nizhalgal Ravi, Abhishek Shankar, Sri Krishna Dayal and Gouri Nair. The series was based on the crime novel Birds of Prey written by Archana Sarat, and was initially announced with that same title. The series comprised six episodes and was released on Aha Tamil on 18 February 2022.

Synopsis
In autumn 1985, ACP Robert Vasudevan investigates the mysterious disappearances of men from the city's affluent families and finds an inexplicable pattern in the abductions, leading him and his team to one common link. Upon conclusion of the investigation, only one woman is standing between Robert and justice.

Cast
 R. Sarathkumar as Robert Vasudevan
 Nizhalgal Ravi as Subbaraj
 Abhishek Shankar as Sivakumar
 Sri Krishna Dayal as Ashok Kumar
 Gouri Nair as Devi
 Ravindra Vijay
 Gokul Anand
 Karuppu Nambiar as Manikandan
 Shrisha as Anita Subramaniam
 Sriranjani Prabhu
 Rethika Srinivasan
 Vaanmadhi

Reception
The series opened to positive reviews. Bhuvanesh Chandar of The New Indian Express rated the series with 3/5 stars, stating that, "What stands apart in this series is Sarath Kumar’s acting. The actor looks the part and is well-aware of what the role demands from him. Even in shots that can easily be tagged as ‘mass-y’, it is Robert who we see. Irai is also helped majorly by its splendid cinematography and editing. The transitions are creatively well done. If Irai goes on to tap into its enormous potential and rights its wrongs for the next season, it might just turn out to be our very own Happy Valley/Broadchurch. And we have waited long enough to deserve such content." OTTplay.com gave a rating of 2.5 out on 5 and wrote, "Irai is a web show that is appealing because of its genre and the lead. It offers viewers a crime thriller that is worth binging. However telling two stories simultaneously might throw off the audience a bit."

Episodes

References

External links 

Aha (streaming service) original programming
Tamil-language web series
Tamil-language thriller television series
2022 Tamil-language television series debuts
Television shows set in Tamil Nadu
Tamil-language crime television series
2022 Tamil-language television series endings